The 2013 Toronto Blue Jays season was the 37th season of Major League Baseball's Toronto Blue Jays franchise, and the 24th full season of play (25th overall) at the Rogers Centre. Despite high expectations heading into the season, the Blue Jays finished 74–88, in last place in the division.

Offseason

Coaching staff

On October 21, 2012, the Blue Jays officially announced that they had released their manager John Farrell from his contract in the same agreement that sent David Carpenter to the Red Sox in exchange for Mike Avilés.

On November 20, 2012, the Blue Jays announced that former manager John Gibbons would once again manage the Blue Jays, in 2013.

On November 26, 2012, the Blue Jays announced most of the coaching staff that will be working under John Gibbons. Five of its six coaching positions were filled. DeMarlo Hale (bench coach), Chad Mottola (hitting coach), Dwayne Murphy (first base coach) Luis Rivera (third base coach) and Pete Walker (pitching coach) were all signed on. The following month, Pat Hentgen was hired as the bullpen coach.

Departing players

After the end of the 2012 season, the Blue Jays lost a number of players including Carlos Villanueva, Kelly Johnson, Jason Frasor and Brandon Lyon. They also declined the option for Rajai Davis, but instead gave him a $2.5 million one-year contract.

Player signings
The Blue Jays started their offseason by signing free agent Maicer Izturis to a three-year $9 million deal with an option year, on November 8. On November 16, they signed free agent Melky Cabrera to a two-year $16 million deal.

Trades
On the same day as the Izturis signing, the Blue Jays acquired RHP Jeremy Jeffress from the Kansas City Royals for cash considerations. They then completed a trade with the Cleveland Indians in which they acquired RHP Esmil Rogers in exchange for the newly acquired Mike Avilés and Yan Gomes.

On November 14, Toronto Blue Jays and Miami Marlins completed a blockbuster trade. Toronto acquired pitcher Josh Johnson, pitcher Mark Buehrle, shortstop José Reyes, utility man Emilio Bonifacio, and catcher John Buck. In return, Toronto sent pitcher Henderson Álvarez, pitching prospect Justin Nicolino, outfield prospect Jake Marisnick, infielder Yunel Escobar, infielder Adeiny Hechavarria, catcher Jeff Mathis and pitching prospect Anthony DeSclafani. Toronto also received $8+ million in cash from the Marlins. The mega-trade is described as a fire sale after the Marlins took on huge salaries a year prior, and dumped all of their high-salaried players.

On December 17, 2012, the Blue Jays acquired the 2012 National League Cy Young Award winner R. A. Dickey in a trade with the New York Mets that sent prospects Travis D'Arnaud, Noah Syndergaard, minor leaguer Wuilmer Becrra and catcher John Buck to New York. Toronto also received catcher Josh Thole and minor league catcher Mike Nickeas in the trade. As part of the transaction, the Blue Jays signed Dickey to an extension worth a total of $29 million over 3 years with a $12 million 4th year option.

Opening Day
The Blue Jays began their 2013 season on April 2, with a home game against the Cleveland Indians. On February 5, 2013 at the annual state of the franchise address, manager John Gibbons named reigning National League Cy Young Award winner R. A. Dickey as the opening day starter for the Blue Jays.

Standings

American League East

American League Wild Card

Records vs opponents

2013 Draft

The 2013 Major League Baseball draft was held on June 6–8.

 – Bickford did not sign with the Blue Jays by the deadline of July 12. Toronto received the 11th overall draft selection as compensation in the 2014 Major League Baseball draft, with which they drafted Max Pentecost.

Roster

Game log

|-  style="text-align:center; background:#ffbbbb;"
| 1 || April 2 || Indians ||  1–4  ||  Masterson (1–0)  || Dickey (0–1) || Perez (1) || 48,847 || 0–1 || 1
|-  style="text-align:center; background:#ffbbbb"
| 2 || April 3 || Indians || 2–3 (11) || Albers (1–0) || Santos (0–1) || Smith (1) || 24,619 || 0–2 || 2
|-  style="text-align:center; background:#bbffbb"
| 3 || April 4 || Indians || 10–8 || Delabar (1–0) || Myers (0–1) || Janssen (1) || 19,515 || 1–2 || 1
|-  style="text-align:center; background:#ffbbbb"
| 4 || April 5 || Red Sox || 4–6 || Tazawa (1–0)  || Rogers (0–1) || Hanrahan (2)  || 45,328  || 1–3 || 2
|-  style="text-align:center; background:#bbffbb"
| 5 || April 6 || Red Sox || 5–0 || Happ (1–0)  || Lackey (0–1) || || 45,797 || 2–3 ||1
|-  style="text-align:center; background:#ffbbbb"
| 6 || April 7 || Red Sox || 0–13 || Lester (2–0) || Dickey (0–2) || || 41,186 || 2–4 || 2
|-  style="text-align:center; background:#ffbbbb"
| 7 || April 9 || @ Tigers || 3–7 || Sánchez (1–0) || Morrow (0–1) || || 28,979 || 2–5 || 3
|-  style="text-align:center; background:#bbffbb"
| 8 || April 10 || @ Tigers || 8–6 || Loup (1–0) || Villarreal (0–1) || Janssen (2) ||  29,631   ||  3–5  || 2
|-  style="text-align:center; background:#ffbbbb"
| 9 || April 11 || @ Tigers || 1–11 || Fister (2–0)  || Johnson (0–1) || || 28,781 || 3–6 ||2
|-  style="text-align:center; background:#bbffbb"
| 10 || April 12 || @ Royals || 8–4 ||Happ (2–0) || Mendoza (0–1) || Loup (1) || 13,049 || 4–6 || 1½
|-  style="text-align:center; background:#bbffbb"
| 11 || April 13 || @ Royals || 3–2 || Dickey (1–2) || Shields (1–2) || Janssen (3) || 21,960 || 5–6 || 1½
|-  style="text-align:center; background:#ffbbbb"
| 12 || April 14 || @ Royals || 2–3 || Herrera (1–0) || Oliver (0–1) ||  || 29,057 || 5–7 || 2½
|-  style="text-align:center; background:#bbffbb"
| 13 || April 15 || White Sox || 4–3 || Buehrle (1–0) || Floyd (0–3) || Janssen (4) || 15,755 || 6–7 || 2½
|-  style="text-align:center; background:#ffbbbb"
| 14 || April 16 || White Sox || 3–4 || Lindstrom (1–0) || Delabar (1–1) || Reed (5) || 16,131 || 6–8 || 3½
|-  style="text-align:center; background:#ffbbbb"
| 15 || April 17 || White Sox || 0–7 || Quintana (1–0) || Happ (2–1) || || 15,684 || 6–9 || 4½
|-  style="text-align:center; background:#bbffbb"
| 16 || April 18 || White Sox || 3–1 || Dickey (2–2)  || Sale (1–2) || Janssen (5) || 18,015  || 7–9 || 4½
|-  style="text-align:center; background:#ffbbbb"
| 17 || April 19 || Yankees || 4–9 ||Pettitte (3–0) || Morrow (0–2) || || 40,028 || 7–10 || 5
|-  style="text-align:center; background:#ffbbbb"
| 18 || April 20 || Yankees || 3–5 (11) || Kelley (1–0) || Loup (1–1) || Rivera (5) || 46,095 || 7–11 || 6
|-  style="text-align:center; background:#bbffbb"
| 19 || April 21 || Yankees || 8–4 || Cecil (1–0) || Logan (0–1) || || 45,575 || 8–11 || 4½
|-  style="text-align:center; background:#ffbbbb"
| 20 || April 22 || @ Orioles || 1–2 || Johnson (1–1) || Loup (1–2) || || 11,168 || 8–12 || 5½
|-  style="text-align:center; background:#ffbbbb"
| 21 || April 23 || @ Orioles || 3–4 || González (2–1) || Dickey (2–3) || Johnson (8) || 13,272 || 8–13 || 5½
|-  style="text-align:center; background:#bbffbb"
| 22 || April 24 || @ Orioles || 6–5 (11) || Rogers (1–1) || Johnson (1–2) || Janssen (6) || 14,981 || 9–13 || 5½
|-  style="text-align:center; background:#ffbbbb"
| 23 || April 25 || @ Yankees ||  3–5  || Kuroda (3–1) || Buehrle (1–1) || Rivera (7) || 31,445 || 9–14 || 6½
|-  style="text-align:center; background:#ffbbbb"
| 24 || April 26 || @ Yankees || 4–6 || Phelps (1–1) ||  Lincoln (0–1) || Rivera (8) || 36,151 || 9–15 || 7½
|-  style="text-align:center; background:#ffbbbb"
| 25 || April 27 || @ Yankees || 4–5 || Sabathia (4–2) || Rogers (1–2) || Chamberlain (1) || 40,258 || 9–16 || 8½
|-  style="text-align:center; background:#ffbbbb"
| 26 || April 28 || @ Yankees || 2–3 || Logan (1–1) || Dickey (2–4) || Rivera (9) || 36,872 || 9–17 || 9½
|-  style="text-align:center; background:#bbffbb"
| 27 || April 30 || Red Sox || 9–7 || Delabar (2–1) || Tazawa (2–1) || Janssen (7) || 22,915 || 10–17 || 8½
|-

|- style="text-align:center; background:#ffbbbb"
| 28 || May 1 || Red Sox || 1–10 || Buchholz (6–0)  || Buehrle (1–2) || || 21,094 || 10–18 ||9½
|- style="text-align:center; background:#ffbbbb"
| 29 || May 2 || Red Sox || 1–3  ||  Dempster (2–2) || Happ (2–2) || Hanrahan (4) || 25,851 || 10–19 || 10½
|- style="text-align:center; background:#ffbbbb"
| 30 || May 3 || Mariners || 0–4 ||  Hernández (4–2)  || Romero (0–1) || || 23,779 || 10–20 ||10½
|- style="text-align:center; background:#ffbbbb"
| 31 || May 4 || Mariners || 1–8  || Iwakuma (3–1) || Dickey (2–5) || || 35,754 || 10–21 || 10½
|- style="text-align:center; background:#bbffbb"
| 32 || May 5 || Mariners || 10–2 || Morrow (1–2) || Saunders (2–4) || || 22,937 || 11–21 || 9½
|- style="text-align:center; background:#bbffbb"
| 33 || May 6 || @ Rays || 8–7 || Oliver (1–1) || Rodney (1–1) || Janssen (8) || 9,952 || 12–21 || 9½
|- style="text-align:center; background:#bbffbb"
| 34 || May 7 || @ Rays || 6–4 || Delabar (3–1) || Peralta (0–2) || Janssen (9) || 10,273 || 13–21  ||8½
|- style="text-align:center; background:#ffbbbb"
| 35 || May 8 || @ Rays || 4–10 ||  Moore (6–0) || Romero (0–2) || || 11,075 || 13–22 ||8½
|- style="text-align:center; background:#ffbbbb"
| 36 || May 9 || @ Rays ||  4–5 (10) || Farnsworth (2–0)   ||   Loup (1–3) || || 11,979 || 13–23 || 8½
|- style="text-align:center; background:#ffbbbb"
| 37 || May 10 || @ Red Sox || 0–5 || Lester (5–0) || Ortiz (0–1) ||   || 33,606  ||  13–24  ||9½
|- style="text-align:center; background:#bbffbb"
| 38 || May 11 || @ Red Sox ||  3–2  ||  Oliver (2–1)  || Tazawa (2–2) || Janssen (10) ||  36,543   ||  14–24  ||9½
|- style="text-align:center; background:#bbffbb"
| 39 || May 12 || @ Red Sox || 12–4 || Jenkins (1–0) || Dempster (2–4) || || 35,532 || 15–24 ||9½
|- style="text-align:center; background:#bbffbb"
| 40 || May 14 || Giants || 10–6 || Dickey (3–5) || Zito (3–2) || || 31,753 || 16–24 ||9½
|- style="text-align:center; background:#bbffbb"
| 41 || May 15 || Giants || 11–3 || Ortiz (1–1) || Vogelsong (1–4) || || 32,863 || 17–24  || 8½
|- style="text-align:center; background:#ffbbbb"
| 42 || May 17 || @ Yankees || 0–5 || Kuroda (6–2) || Buehrle (1–3) ||  || 40,008 || 17–25 || 9
|- style="text-align:center; background:#ffbbbb"
| 43 || May 18 || @ Yankees || 2–7 || Phelps (2–2) || Morrow (1–3) ||  || 45,577 || 17–26 || 10
|- style="text-align:center; background:#bbb"
| — || May 19 || @ Yankees  ||colspan=7| Postponed (rain) Rescheduled for August 20|- style="text-align:center; background:#bbffbb"
| 44 || May 20 || Rays || 7–5 || Dickey (4–5) || Lueke (0–1) ||  || 29,885 || 18–26 || 10
|- style="text-align:center; background:#ffbbbb"
| 45 || May 21 || Rays || 3–4 || Cobb (5–2) || Ortiz (1–2) || Rodney (9) || 15,802 || 18–27 || 10
|- style="text-align:center; background:#bbffbb"
| 46 || May 22 || Rays || 4–3 (10) || Loup (2–3) || Ramos (1–1) || || 18,771 || 19–27 ||9
|- style="text-align:center; background:#bbffbb"
| 47 || May 23 || Orioles || 12–6 || Morrow (2–3) || Gausman (0–1) || || 21,466 || 20–27 || 8½
|- style="text-align:center; background:#ffbbbb"
| 48 || May 24 || Orioles || 6–10 || Tillman (4–2) || Nolan (0–1) || || 25,104 || 20–28 || 9½
|- style="text-align:center; background:#ffbbbb"
| 49 || May 25 || Orioles || 5–6 || García (1–2) || Dickey (4–6) || Johnson (15) || 35,915 || 20–29 || 10½
|- style="text-align:center; background:#bbffbb"
| 50 || May 26 || Orioles || 6–5 || Delabar (4–1) || Johnson (2–5) || || 28,502 ||  21–29  || 9½
|- style="text-align:center; background:#bbffbb"
| 51 || May 27 || Braves || 9–3 || Buehrle (2–3) || Hudson (4–4) ||  || 22,808 || 22–29 ||9½
|- style="text-align:center; background:#ffbbbb"
| 52 || May 28 || Braves || 6–7 (10) || Gearrin (2–1) || Weber (0–1) || Kimbrel (16) || 45,224 || 22–30 ||9½
|- style="text-align:center; background:#bbffbb"
| 53 || May 29 || @ Braves || 3–0 || Pérez (1–0) || Medlen (1–6) || Janssen (11) || 22,489 || 23–30 ||8½
|- style="text-align:center; background:#ffbbbb"
| 54 || May 30 || @ Braves || 3–11 || Minor (7–2)  ||    Dickey (4–7) || || 29,967 || 23–31 || 9½
|- style="text-align:center; background:#ffbbbb"
| 55 || May 31 || @ Padres || 3–4 (17) ||  Richard (1–5) || Redmond (0–1) || || 24,219 || 23–32 || 9½
|-

|- style="text-align:center; background:#ffbbbb"
| 56 || June 1 || @ Padres || 3–4 || Erlin (1–0) || Buehrle (2–4) || Gregerson (1) || 40,403 || 23–33 ||10½
|- style="text-align:center; background:#bbffbb"
| 57 || June 2 || @ Padres || 7–4 (11) || Janssen (1–0) || Boxberger (0–1) || Loup (2) || 20,384 || 24–33 ||10½
|- style="text-align:center; background:#ffbbbb"
| 58 || June 4 || @ Giants ||  1–2  ||  Lincecum (4–5)  || Johnson (0–2) || Romo (16) || 41,981 || 24–34 || 11½
|- style="text-align:center; background:#bbffbb"
| 59 || June 5 || @ Giants || 4–0 || Dickey (5–7)  || Zito (4–4) || Janssen (12) ||  41,559 || 25–34 || 10½
|- style="text-align:center; background:#bbffbb"
| 60 || June 7 || Rangers || 6–1 ||  Wagner (1–0) || Tepesch (3–5) || || 36,010 || 26–34 || 10½
|- style="text-align:center; background:#bbffbb"
| 61 || June 8 || Rangers || 4–3 (18) || Loup (3–3)   || Wolf (1–1) ||  || 44,079 || 27–34 || 10
|- style="text-align:center; background:#ffbbbb"
| 62 || June 9 || Rangers || 4–6 || Cotts (2–0) || Wagner (1–1) ||  Nathan (19) || 42,722 || 27–35 || 11
|- style="text-align:center; background:#ffbbbb"
| 63 || June 10 || @ White Sox || 6–10 || Jones (2–4) || Dickey (5–8) || || 18,126 || 27–36 || 12
|- style="text-align:center; background:#bbffbb"
| 64 || June 11 || @ White Sox || 7–5 (10)|| Cecil (2–0) || Troncoso (0–1) || Janssen (13) || 20,700 || 28–36 || 11
|- style="text-align:center; background:#bbbbbb"
| — || June 12 || @ White Sox ||colspan=7| Postponed (rain)'' Rescheduled for September 23
|- style="text-align:center; background:#bbffbb"
| 65 || June 13 || @ Rangers || 3–1 || Rogers (2–2) || Cotts (2–1) || Janssen (14) || 32,013 || 29–36 || 10½
|- style="text-align:center; background:#bbffbb"
| 66 || June 14 || @ Rangers || 8–0 || Buehrle (3–4) || Grimm (5–5) ||   || 37,203 || 30–36 || 9½
|- style="text-align:center; background:#bbffbb"
| 67 || June 15 || @ Rangers || 6–1 || Dickey (6–8) || Lindblom (0–2) ||   || 33,121 || 31–36 || 9½
|- style="text-align:center; background:#bbffbb"
| 68 || June 16 || @ Rangers || 7–2 || Wang (1–0) || Holland (5–4) ||   || 44,052 || 32–36 || 8½
|- style="text-align:center; background:#bbffbb"
| 69 || June 17 || Rockies || 2–0   || Cecil (3–0)  || Belisle (4–4)    || Janssen (15)  ||  20,946   ||  33–36  || 8
|- style="text-align:center; background:#bbffbb"
| 70 || June 18 || Rockies || 8–3 || Rogers (3–2) || Francis (2–5) ||   || 22,852 || 34–36 ||8½
|- style="text-align:center; background:#bbffbb"
| 71 || June 19 || Rockies || 5–2 || Buehrle (4–4) || Nicasio (4–3) || Janssen (16) || 27,235 || 35–36 ||7½
|- style="text-align:center; background:#bbffbb"
| 72 || June 21 || Orioles || 7–6 || Janssen (2–0) || Matusz (2–1) || || 35,472 || 36–36 || 7
|- style="text-align:center; background:#bbffbb"
| 73 || June 22 || Orioles || 4–2 || Oliver (3–1) || González (5–3) || Janssen (17)  ||  43,261  || 37–36 || 6
|- style="text-align:center; background:#bbffbb"
| 74 || June 23 || Orioles || 13–5 || Johnson (1–2) || García (3–5) || || 45,214 || 38–36 || 5
|- style="text-align:center; background:#ffbbbb"
| 75 || June 24 || @ Rays || 1–4 || Hellickson (6–3) || Rogers (3–3) || Rodney (16) || 11,407 || 38–37 || 5½
|- style="text-align:center; background:#ffbbbb"
| 76 || June 25 || @ Rays || 1–5 || Moore (10–3) || Buehrle (4–5) || || 12,041 || 38–38 || 6½
|- style="text-align:center; background:#bbffbb"
| 77 || June 26 || @ Rays || 3–0 || Dickey (7–8) || Hernández (4–9) || || 21,502 || 39–38 || 6½
|- style="text-align:center; background:#ffbbbb"
| 78 || June 27 || @ Red Sox ||  4–7   ||  Lester (8–4)  ||   Wang (1–1)    || Uehara (3)  ||   34,750  ||  39–39  || 7½
|- style="text-align:center; background:#ffbbbb"
| 79 || June 28 || @ Red Sox || 5–7 ||  Miller (1–2)  ||  Wagner (1–2) || Uehara (4) ||  36,383  || 39–40 || 8½
|- style="text-align:center; background:#bbffbb"
| 80 || June 29 || @ Red Sox || 6–2 ||  Delabar (5–1)  ||  Tazawa (4–3) ||   ||  37,437  || 40–40 || 7½
|- style="text-align:center; background:#ffbbbb"
| 81 || June 30 || @ Red Sox || 4–5 || Uehara (1–0)  || Pérez (1–1) ||   ||  37,425  || 40–41 || 8½
|-

|- style="text-align:center; background:#bbffbb"
| 82 || July 1 || Tigers ||  8–3  ||  Dickey (8–8)  ||  Álvarez (1–2)    ||   ||  45,766   || 41–41 || 8
|- style="text-align:center; background:#ffbbbb"
| 83 || July 2 || Tigers || 6–7   ||  Alburquerque (1–1)  ||   Wagner (1–3)  || Benoit (6)  ||  27,189   || 41–42   || 9
|- style="text-align:center; background:#ffbbbb"
| 84 || July 3 || Tigers ||  2–6  ||  Scherzer (13–0)  ||  Johnson (1–3)   ||  ||  28,958 ||  41–43   ||  10  
|- style="text-align:center; background:#ffbbbb"
| 85 || July 4 || Tigers ||  1–11  ||  Verlander (9–5)  ||   Rogers (3–4)  ||  || 35,978  ||  41–44   ||  11  
|- style="text-align:center; background:#bbffbb"
| 86 || July 5 || Twins || 4–0  || Buehrle (5–5)  ||  Correia (6–6)  ||   ||  25,672   || 42–44   || 11
|- style="text-align:center; background:#ffbbbb"
| 87 || July 6 || Twins || 0–6  || Pelfrey (4–6)  ||  Dickey (8–9) ||    || 37,034   || 42–45  || 11
|- style="text-align:center; background:#bbffbb"
| 88 || July 7 || Twins || 11–5  || Redmond (1–1)  || Diamond (5–8)   ||   || 43,795  || 43–45   || 10
|- style="text-align:center; background:#ffbbbb"
| 89 || July 9 || @ Indians ||  0–3  || Jiménez (7–4)   ||    Johnson (1–4)   ||  Perez (10) ||   13,640  ||  43–46  || 10½
|- style="text-align:center; background:#bbffbb"
| 90 || July 10 || @ Indians || 5–4  || Wagner (2–3)  ||  Hill (0–2)  || Delabar (1)  || 14,134  || 44–46  || 10½
|- style="text-align:center; background:#ffbbbb"
| 91 || July 11 || @ Indians ||  2–4  || Salazar (1–0)   ||   Dickey (8–10)    || Perez (11) ||  20,641   ||  44–47  || 11½
|- style="text-align:center; background:#ffbbbb"
| 92 || July 12 || @ Orioles ||  5–8  || Tillman (11–3)  ||  Buehrle (5–6)  || Johnson (32) ||  42,660  || 44–48   || 12½
|- style="text-align:center; background:#bbffbb"
| 93 || July 13 || @ Orioles || 7–3  || Loup (4–3)  ||  Hammel (7–6)   || Janssen (18)  ||  46,150  || 45–48  || 11½
|- style="text-align:center; background:#ffbbbb"
| 94 || July 14 || @ Orioles ||  4–7  ||  Feldman (1–1)  ||   Johnson (1–5)    || Johnson (33)  ||  34,748   ||  45–49  || 11½
|- style="text-align:center; background:#ffbbbb"
| 95 || July 19 || Rays ||  5–8  || Price (4–5)  ||  Cecil (3–1)  ||   || 33,266  || 45–50  || 12½
|- style="text-align:center; background:#ffbbbb"
| 96 || July 20 || Rays || 3–4   || Hellickson (9–3)  ||  Buehrle  (5–7)  || Rodney (23) ||  42,639  || 45–51   || 12½
|- style="text-align:center; background:#ffbbbb"
| 97 || July 21 || Rays || 3–4   || Archer (5–3)  || Dickey (8–11)    || Rodney (24)  ||  41,247   || 45–52   || 13½
|- style="text-align:center; background:#ffbbbb"
| 98 || July 22 || Dodgers ||  5–14  ||  Ryu (8–3)  ||   Johnson (1–6) ||   ||  34,515   ||  45–53  || 13½
|- style="text-align:center; background:#ffbbbb"
| 99 || July 23 || Dodgers || 9–10  || League (4–3) || Oliver (3–2)  || Jansen (12)|| 32,158 || 45–54 || 14½
|- style="text-align:center; background:#ffbbbb"
| 100 || July 24 || Dodgers || 3–8 (10) || League (5–3) || Pérez (1–2) ||    || 35,368 || 45–55 || 14½
|- style="text-align:center; background:#bbffbb"
| 101 || July 25 || Astros || 4–0  || Buehrle (6–7)   ||  Bédard (3–8)   ||   ||  24,188   || 46–55   || 14
|- style="text-align:center; background:#bbffbb"
| 102 || July 26 || Astros || 12–6  || Cecil (4–1)  ||  Clemens (4–4)  ||   || 24,088   || 47–55  || 13½
|- style="text-align:center; background:#ffbbbb"
| 103 || July 27 || Astros || 6–8   || Keuchel (5–5)  ||  Johnson (1–7)   || Veras (19) || 34,137  ||  47–56  || 14½
|- style="text-align:center; background:#bbffbb"
| 104 || July 28 || Astros || 2–1  || Janssen (3–0)   ||  Cisnero (2–2)   || || 31,634 || 48–56  || 14
|- style="text-align:center; background:#ffbbbb"
| 105 || July 29 || @ Athletics ||  4–9  ||  Griffin (10–7)  ||   Rogers (3–5)    ||   ||  13,309   ||  48–57  ||  14½
|- style="text-align:center; background:#bbffbb"
| 106 || July 30 || @ Athletics || 5–0  || Buehrle (7–7)   ||  Straily (6–5)  ||   ||  17,479   || 49–57  || 14½
|- style="text-align:center; background:#bbffbb"
| 107 || July 31 || @ Athletics || 5–2 (10) || Janssen (4–0)  ||  Chavez (2–3)  || Cecil (1)  ||  23,638  ||  50–57  || 14
|-

|- style="text-align:center; background:#ffbbbb"
| 108 || August 1 || @ Angels || 2–8  || Richards (3–4)  || Johnson (1–8)  ||   || 37,179   || 50–58   || 15
|- style="text-align:center; background:#ffbbbb"
| 109 || August 2 || @ Angels || 5–7  || De La Rosa (5–1)   ||  Delabar (5–2)  || Frieri (26)  ||  38,884   || 50–59  || 15
|- style="text-align:center; background:#ffbbbb"
| 110 || August 3 || @ Angels || 3–7  || Weaver (6–5)  ||  Rogers (3–6)  ||   ||  41,253   || 50–60  || 16
|- style="text-align:center; background:#bbffbb"
| 111 || August 4 || @ Angels || 6–5  || Cecil (5–1)   ||  Frieri (0–4)  || Janssen (19) ||  33,936   ||  51–60  || 16
|- style="text-align:center; background:#bbffbb"
| 112 || August 5 || @ Mariners || 3–1  || Dickey (9–11)  ||  Iwakuma (10–5)  || Janssen (20) ||  32,300   || 52–60  || 15
|- style="text-align:center; background:#bbffbb"
| 113 || August 6 || @ Mariners || 7–2  || Johnson (2–8)  ||  Hernández (11–5)  ||   ||  28,198   || 53–60 || 15
|- style="text-align:center; background:#ffbbbb"
| 114 || August 7 || @ Mariners || 7–9  || Maurer (3–7) || Loup (4–4) || Farquhar (3)  ||  34,792  || 53–61  || 16
|- style="text-align:center; background:#ffbbbb"
| 115 || August 9 || Athletics ||  6–14  ||  Parker (8–6)  ||   Rogers (3–7)   ||   ||  31,862   ||  53–62  || 15½
|- style="text-align:center; background:#bbffbb"
| 116 || August 10 || Athletics || 5–4  || Buehrle (8–7)  ||  Gray (0–1)  || Janssen (21) || 39,634   || 54–62 || 15½
|- style="text-align:center; background:#ffbbbb"
| 117 || August 11 || Athletics || 4–6  || Cook (4–2)  ||  Oliver (3–3) || Balfour (30)  ||  45,312  || 54–63 || 15½
|- style="text-align:center; background:#ffbbbb"
| 118 || August 12 || Athletics ||  1–5  ||  Cook (5–2)  ||    Janssen (4–1)   ||   || 36,111 ||  54–64  || 16
|- style="text-align:center; background:#ffbbbb"
| 119 || August 13 || Red Sox ||  2–4 (11) ||  Uehara (3–0)  ||   Loup (4–5) ||   ||  32,816   ||  54–65  || 17
|- style="text-align:center; background:#bbffbb"
| 120 || August 14 || Red Sox || 4–3 (10)  || Lincoln (1–1)   || Workman (3–2)  ||   ||  31,695  || 55–65 || 16
|- style="text-align:center; background:#bbffbb"
| 121 || August 15 || Red Sox || 2–1 || Buehrle (9–7) || Peavy (9–5) || Janssen (22) || 40,477 || 56–65 || 15
|- style="text-align:center; background:#ffbbbb"
| 122 || August 16 || @ Rays || 4–5 || Rodney (5–3)  || Loup (4–6) ||    || 15,433   || 56–66 || 15
|- style="text-align:center; background:#bbffbb"
| 123 || August 17 || @ Rays || 6–2  || Happ (3–2)  ||  Hernández (6–13)  ||   || 25,036   ||  57–66  || 15
|- style="text-align:center; background:#ffbbbb"
| 124 || August 18 || @ Rays || 1–2 (10)  || McGee (3–3) || Lincoln (1–2)  ||    || 23,373    || 57–67  || 15
|- style="text-align:center; background:#ffbbbb"
| 125 || August 20 || @ Yankees ||  4–8  ||  Nova (7–4)  ||    Wagner (2–4)   ||   ||  40,248   || 57–68   || 16
|- style="text-align:center; background:#ffbbbb"
| 126 || August 20 || @ Yankees ||  2–3  ||  Rivera (4–2)  ||    Oliver (3–4)   ||   ||  37,190   || 57–69   || 16
|- style="text-align:center; background:#ffbbbb"
| 127 || August 21 || @ Yankees ||  2–4  ||  Huff (1–0)  ||  Dickey (9–12)  || Rivera (37) ||  36,140  ||  57–70  || 17
|- style="text-align:center; background:#ffbbbb"
| 128 || August 22 || @ Yankees || 3–5 || Pettitte (9–9) || Happ (3–3) || Robertson (2) || 40,116 || 57–71 || 17½
|- style="text-align:center; background:#ffbbbb"
| 129 || August 23 || @ Astros || 4–12  || Lyles (6–6) || Redmond (1–2) ||  || 21,186 || 57–72 || 17½
|- style="text-align:center; background:#ffbbbb"
| 130 || August 24 || @ Astros || 5–8 || Peacock (3–4) || Wang (1–2) || Lo (2) || 26,312 || 57–73 || 18½
|- style="text-align:center; background:#bbffbb"
| 131 || August 25 || @ Astros || 2–1  || Buehrle (10–7)  ||  Lo (0–2)  || Janssen (23) ||  21,407  ||  58–73  || 18½
|- style="text-align:center; background:#bbffbb"
| 132 || August 26 || Yankees || 5–2  ||  Dickey (10–12)  || Hughes (4–13)   || Janssen (24)  ||   35,241  ||  59–73  || 18
|- style="text-align:center; background:#ffbbbb"
| 133 || August 27 || Yankees || 1–7  || Pettitte (10–9)   || Happ (3–4)  ||   ||  34,047   || 59–74  || 19
|- style="text-align:center; background:#bbffbb"
| 134 || August 28 || Yankees || 7–2  || Redmond (2–2)   ||  Kuroda (11–10) ||   ||  36,565   || 60–74   || 19
|- style="text-align:center; background:#bbffbb"
| 135 || August 30 || Royals || 3–2  || Buehrle (11–7) || Santana (8–8)  || Janssen (25)  || 21,031  || 61–74  || 18½
|- style="text-align:center; background:#bbffbb"
| 136 || August 31 || Royals || 4–2  || Dickey (11–12)  ||  Herrera (5–7)  || Janssen (26)  || 34,315  || 62–74  || 18½
|-

|- style="text-align:center; background:#ffbbbb"
| 137 || September 1 || Royals || 0–5  || Shields (10–8)  ||  Happ (3–5)  ||   || 22,961  || 62–75  || 19½
|- style="text-align:center; background:#bbffbb"
| 138 || September 2 || @ D-backs || 4–1 || Rogers (4–7)  || McCarthy (3–9) || Janssen (27)  || 21,014  || 63–75  || 18½
|- style="text-align:center; background:#bbffbb"
| 139 || September 3 || @ D-backs || 10–4  || Redmond (3–2)  || Miley (9–10)   ||    || 19,100  || 64–75  || 18½
|- style="text-align:center; background:#ffbbbb"
| 140 || September 4 || @ D-backs || 3–4 (10) || Harris (3–0)  || Pérez (0–1)  ||   || 16,154 || 64–76  || 19½
|- style="text-align:center; background:#bbffbb"
| 141 || September 6 || @ Twins || 6–5 || Dickey (12–12)  ||  Pelfrey (5–11)  || Janssen (28)  || 27,044 || 65–76 || 20
|- style="text-align:center; background:#bbffbb"
| 142 || September 7 || @ Twins || 11–2  || Happ (4–5)   || Correia (9–11)  ||   || 32,882 || 66–76  || 20
|- style="text-align:center; background:#bbffbb"
| 143 || September 8 || @ Twins || 2–0  || Rogers (5–7)  ||  Burton (2–9) || Janssen (29)  || 29,450 || 67–76  || 19
|- style="text-align:center; background:#ffbbbb"
| 144 || September 10 || Angels || 6–12  || Williams (7–10) || Buehrle (11–8)  ||   || 19,079   || 67–77 || 20
|- style="text-align:center; background:#ffbbbb"
| 145 || September 11 || Angels || 4–5  || Wilson (16–6)  ||  Delabar (5–3) || Frieri (32)  ||  17,994  || 67–78  || 21
|- style="text-align:center; background:#ffbbbb"
| 146 || September 12 || Angels || 3–4 || Richards (7–6) || Happ (4–6) || Frieri (33)  ||  20,767   || 67–79  || 21
|- style="text-align:center; background:#ffbbbb"
| 147 || September 13 || Orioles || 3–5 || Hunter (6–5)  || Delabar (5–4)  || Johnson (44) ||  20,024  ||  67–80  || 22
|- style="text-align:center; background:#bbffbb"
| 148 || September 14 || Orioles || 4–3 || Jeffress (1–0) || Tillman (16–6) || Janssen (30)  ||  29,942  || 68–80  || 22
|- style="text-align:center; background:#ffbbbb"
| 149 || September 15 || Orioles || 1–3 || González (10–7) || Buehrle (11–9)  || Johnson (45) || 22,331  || 68–81  || 23
|- style="text-align:center; background:#bbffbb"
| 150 || September 17 || Yankees ||  2–0  ||  Dickey (13–12)  ||    Pettitte (10–10)   ||  Janssen (31) ||   24,894  ||  69–81  || 22
|- style="text-align:center; background:#ffbbbb"
| 151 || September 18 || Yankees || 3–4 || Huff (3–1) || Delabar (5–5)  || Rivera (44) || 24,247 || 69–82 || 22
|- style="text-align:center; background:#bbffbb"
| 152 || September 19 || Yankees || 6–2 || Redmond (4–2) || Kuroda (11–12) || Janssen (32) || 32,003 || 70–82  || 22
|- style="text-align:center; background:#ffbbbb"
| 153 || September 20 || @ Red Sox || 3–6 || Lester (15–8) || Rogers (5–8) || Uehara (20) || 37,215 || 70–83 || 23
|- style="text-align:center; background:#bbffbb"
| 154 || September 21 || @ Red Sox || 4–2 || Buehrle (12–9) || Buchholz (11–1) || Janssen (33) || 37,569 || 71–83 || 22
|- style="text-align:center; background:#ffbbbb"
| 155 || September 22 || @ Red Sox || 2–5 || Doubront (11–6) || Dickey (13–13) || Uehara (21) || 37,020 || 71–84 || 23
|- style="text-align:center; background:#ffbbbb"
| 156 || September 23 || @ White Sox || 2–3 || Quintana (9–6) || Happ (4–7) || Reed (39) || 19,122 || 71–85 || 23½
|- style="text-align:center; background:#bbffbb"
| 157 || September 24 || @ Orioles || 3–2 (10) || Santos (1–1) || Rodríguez (3–2) || Janssen (34) || 16,772 || 72–85 || 22½
|- style="text-align:center; background:#ffbbbb"
| 158 || September 25 || @ Orioles || 5–9 || McFarland (3–1) || Rogers (5–9) || Hammel (1)  || 23,698 || 72–86 || 23½
|- style="text-align:center; background:#ffbbbb"
| 159 || September 26 || @ Orioles || 2–3 || González (11–8) || Buehrle (12–10) || Johnson (48) || 27,498 || 72–87 || 24
|- style="text-align:center; background:#bbffbb"
| 160 || September 27 || Rays || 6–3 || Dickey (14–13) || Hellickson (12–10) || Santos (1) || 27,288 || 73–87 || 24 
|- style="text-align:center; background:#bbffbb"
| 161 || September 28 || Rays || 7–2 || Happ (5–7) || Torres (4–2) ||    || 33,232 || 74–87 || 23 
|- style="text-align:center; background:#ffbbbb"
| 162 || September 29 || Rays || 6–7   ||  Moore (17–4)  ||  Redmond (4–3)      ||Rodney (37)   ||   44,551  ||74–88    ||23 
|-

Farm system

LEAGUE CHAMPIONS: Vancouver

References

External links
2013 Toronto Blue Jays at Baseball Reference

Toronto Blue Jays seasons
Toronto Blue Jays
2013 in Canadian sports
2013 in Toronto